In 2021, a number of missionary kidnappings were carried out by the 400 Mawozo gang in Port-au-Prince, Haiti.  400 Mawozo is a Haitian gang that controls areas around Port-au-Prince.

Kidnappings 
On Saturday, 16 October 2021, 17 Christian missionaries from the Ohio-based Christian Aid Ministries were abducted by 400 Mawozo. Typically after a kidnapping, the gang makes a demand for a ransom. In a previous kidnapping, in April 2021, the group demanded $1 million apiece for the release of Catholic missionaries. The gang's name, loosely translated from Creole, means 400 simpletons, or untrained men. Although kidnappings have been its new trade, the gang is known for threatening the use of rape and assassination to maintain power over the areas it controls. According to former Haitian Senator Jean Renel Senatus who headed the justice and security commission, the group was originally called "Texas" and was known for holding up residents and stealing motorcycles.  Senatus himself had also received death threats from the group. Their alleged leader is Wilson Joseph and goes by the nickname "Lanmò San Jou" or "Lanmò Sanjou", which means "death doesn't know which day it's coming" or "death has no appointment." He has flaunted the arrest warrant against him in online videos detailing his group's crimes. The group's second-in-command is Joly "Yonyon" Germine, and he is currently incarcerated.

On 16 December 2021, the Haitian justice minister announced that all the captives had been freed. Several of the captives had been freed in earlier weeks.

Aftermath 
On 7 November 2022, the United States Department of State announced reward offers of up to  each for information leading to the arrest or conviction of Lanmò Sanjou and two other Haitian gang leaders—Jermaine Stephenson, or Gaspiyay; and Vitel'Homme Innocent—for their roles in the kidnappings.

References 

2018–2023 Haitian crisis
Crime in Haiti
2021 in Haiti
Christianity in Haiti
2021 crimes in Haiti